Scoglio Formiche di Grosseto Lighthouse  is an active lighthouse established on the largest of three skerries located  south west of Marina di Grosseto.

Description
The lighthouse and the keeper’s house were built in 1901 and restored in 1919 by the Regia Marina. The lighthouse is fully automated and operated by Marina Militare identified by the code number 2136 E.F.

See also
 List of lighthouses in Italy

References

External links

Gallery Formiche di Grosseto lighthouse Marina Militare
 Servizio Fari Marina Militare 

Lighthouses in Tuscany
Buildings and structures in Grosseto
Lighthouses in Italy